The Luis Girón is a 7,000-seat football stadium in La Lima, Honduras, and home of the Parrillas One.  The work on this venue began in February 2018 and is scheduled to be completed in early 2020.

References

Football venues in Honduras
Stadiums under construction